Ajanta Neog (born in 1964) is an Indian politician who is currently the Finance and Social Welfare Minister in the Government of Assam. She is the first woman Finance Minister of Assam. She has been representing the Golaghat Assembly seat consecutively for the past five terms since 2001. She also holds the record for being the longest serving female legislator from Assam.

Currently, she is a member of the Bharatiya Janata Party which she joined in December 2020. After she resigned her post as a MLA .

Early life and education 
Ajanta Neog was born in Guwahati to the late Sasadhar Das and the late Rebati Das. Her mother Rebati Das, was a former Member of Assam Legislative Assembly for Jalukbari. She has secured her MA, LLB and LLM from Gauhati University, she is an alumna of Handique Girls College. After completing her degrees she practiced law as an advocate in Gauhati High Court for a few years.

Indian National Congress 

She first entered the assembly in the 2001 elections by defeating her nearest rival by over 10000 votes. She was again victorious in the subsequent election held in 2006. In the 2011 assembly elections she won by a huge margin of 46171 votes.  Consecutively she won the 2016 assembly elections despite a ‘BJP Wave’ in upper Assam where a vast majority of the Congress candidates were defeated. She held the position of Minister for the Public Works Department (Roads & Building, NH), Urban Development & Housing, and had been in the last three Cabinets. She was also given the additional charge of  Minister for Planning and Development, Judicial, Legislative, Pension & Public Grievance in 2015. She was conferred with the Golaghat ratna award by the united chamber of commerce, Golaghat.

During her tenure as the PWD minister, Assam achieved huge success in infrastructure development.  Assam was adjudged the Best Infrastructure Development State in the big state category in the 13th States Conclave by India Today group held on 6 November 2015. Assam was adjudged the best State in Infrastructure Development because it had registered a 17 percent increase in the length of Pucca road from 2011 to 2013–14, whereas the National average for the same period was four percent.

Bharatiya Janata Party 
In December 2020, Ajanta Neog along with Rajdeep Gowala (both incumbent legislators ) joined the Bharatiya Janata Party after both were expelled from Indian National Congress for their alleged "anti-party" activities. She called her former party ‘vision less’ and disconnected from people while speaking to reporters. She also said that she is joining the BJP to protect the interest of the indigenous people of Assam from the ‘unholy’ alliance of the Congress Party and AIUDF.

She subsequently won the 2021 Assembly election from the Golaghat constituency on a BJP ticket defeating her nearest rival from the Congress Party. With this victory she became  a MLA for the 5th term consecutively from the Golaghat LAC. She was inducted into the Himanta Biswa Sarma Cabinet as the Finance Minister creating history by being the first woman Finance Minister of the state.

Personal life 
Ajanta Neog was married to former congress leader Nagen Neog who was killed along with eight others by the outlawed United Liberation Front of Asom in 1996. Her husband was a former minister and belonged to the Chutia ethnic group. She has two sons.

References 

Indian National Congress politicians from Assam
Assam MLAs 2001–2006
Assam MLAs 2006–2011
Assam MLAs 2011–2016
Assam MLAs 2016–2021
State cabinet ministers of Assam
Women members of the Assam Legislative Assembly
Living people
Politicians from Guwahati
People from Golaghat
21st-century Indian women politicians
21st-century Indian politicians
Women state cabinet ministers of India
Bharatiya Janata Party politicians from Assam
Assam MLAs 2021–2026
1964 births